Degerman Daresi (also Romanized as Degermān Daresī; also known as Degermān Darrehsī) is a village in Qanibeyglu Rural District, Zanjanrud District, Zanjan County, Zanjan Province, Iran. At the 2006 census, its population was 331, in 79 families.

References 

Populated places in Zanjan County